Marcus Quinn (born June 27, 1959) is a former safety in the National Football League (NFL) and the United States Football League (USFL). He played college football at LSU.

Early life and high school
Quinn was born in Tylertown, Mississippi and grew up in New Orleans, Louisiana and attended St. Augustine High School. He helped lead the Purple Knights to a 15–0 record as a junior and was named first-team All-State as a senior.

College career
Quinn was a member of the LSU Tigers for four seasons. He played running back as a freshman in 1977 before moving to defensive back. Quinn was a three-year starter at safety in a defensive backfield nicknamed the "Soul Patrol" along with future NFL players Willie Teal, James Britt and Chris Williams. Quinn finished his collegiate career with six interceptions.

Professional career
Quinn was signed by the Ottawa Rough Riders after going unselected in the 1981 NFL Draft but was cut during training camp. He was signed by the New Orleans Saints in 1982 but was waived during final roster cuts. Quinn was signed by the Oakland Invaders of the newly formed United States Football League (USFL) on February 7, 1983. He was named All-USFL and the 1984 USFL Defensive Player of Year after leading the league with 12 interceptions. Quinn began the 1985 in a contract dispute with the Invaders and was traded to the Tampa Bay Bandits in March. Quinn was signed by the Tampa Bay Buccaneers in October 1987 as a replacement player during the 1987 NFL players strike and started three games at strong safety before being released when the strike ended.

References

1959 births
Living people
Tampa Bay Bandits players
Oakland Invaders players
Tampa Bay Buccaneers players
American football safeties
LSU Tigers football players
Players of American football from New Orleans
Players of Canadian football from New Orleans
National Football League replacement players
New Orleans Saints players
Ottawa Rough Riders players